Do Yaar is a 1972 Indian Hindi-language action film directed by Kewal Mishra. The film stars Vinod Khanna, Rekha, Shatrughan Sinha, Nazima in lead roles. It was later remade in Telugu as Iddaru Iddare (1976) and Tamil as Kuppathu Raja (1979).

Plot synopsis
Rajesh is on a mission to seek revenge on Jagira, who ruined his sister's life. However, when the two men meet, they become friends, unaware of each other's real identities.

Cast 
Vinod Khanna as Rajesh / Raju
Rekha as Seema
Shatrughan Sinha as Jagira / Jugal
Nazima as Shanno / Moti Bai

Music

References

External links 
 

1972 films
1970s Hindi-language films
1972 action films
Hindi films remade in other languages
Films scored by Sonik-Omi
Indian action films
Hindi-language action films